Guatemala competed at the 1984 Summer Olympics in Los Angeles, United States. 24 competitors, 20 men and 4 women, took part in 40 events in 9 sports.

Athletics

Men's 400 metres
 Alberto López
 Heat — 52.21 (→ did not advance)

Men's Decathlon 
 Ángel Estu Díaz 
 Final Result — 6342 points (→ 24th place)

Men's 20 km Walk
 José Victor Alonzo
 Final — 1:35:32 (→ 34th place)

Men's 50 km Walk
 José Víctor Alonzo
 Final — 4:36:35 (→ 17th place)

Christa Shuman
Patricia Meighan
Vladimir Samayoa
Hugo Allan García

Boxing

Men's Light Flyweight (– 48 kg)
 Carlos Motta
 First Round — Defeated Mustafa Genç (TUR), 5:0
 Second Round — Defeated Daniel Mwangi (KEN), 4:1
 Quarterfinals — Lost to Marcelino Bolivar (VEN), 0:5

Cycling

One cyclists represented Guatemala in 1984.

1000m time trial
 Max Leiva

Equestrianism

Rowing

Sailing

Shooting

Swimming

Men's 100m Freestyle 
Rodrigo Leal
 Heat — 56.80 (→ did not advance, 58th place)

Ernesto-José Degenhart
 Heat — 57.20 (→ did not advance, 60th place)

Men's 200m Freestyle 
Roberto Granados
 Heat — 2:05.21 (→ did not advance, 50th place)

Rodrigo Leal
 Heat — 2:05.96 (→ did not advance, 51st place)

Men's 100m Backstroke 
Ernesto-José Degenhart
 Heat — 1:05.63 (→ did not advance, 39th place)

Men's 200m Backstroke 
Ernesto-José Degenhart
 Heat — 2:24.08 (→ did not advance, 33rd place)

Men's 100m Breaststroke
Fernando Marroquin
 Heat — 1:09.73 (→ did not advance, 44th place)

Men's 200m Breaststroke 
Fernando Marroquin
 Heat — 2:35.21 (→ did not advance, 40th place)

Men's 100m Butterfly
Roberto Granados
 Heat — 1:02.32 (→ did not advance, 44th place)

Men's 200m Butterfly
Roberto Granados
 Heat — 2:13.79 (→ did not advance, 32nd place)

Men's 200m Individual Medley
Roberto Granados
 Heat — 2:22.73 (→ did not advance, 38th place)

Men's 4 × 100 m Freestyle Relay 
Rodrigo Leal, Fernando Marroquin, Roberto Granados, and Ernesto-José Degenhart
 Heat — 3:52.18 (→ did not advance, 21st place)

Men's 4 × 100 m Medley Relay
Ernesto José Degenhart, Fernando Marroquin, Roberto Granados, and Rodrigo Leal
 Heat — 4:16.94 (→ did not advance, 19th place)

Women's 100m Freestyle
Blanca Morales
 Heat — 1:02.48 (→ did not advance, 37th place)

Karen Slowing
 Heat — 1:03.46 (→ did not advance, 41st place)

Women's 200m Freestyle
Karen Slowing
 Heat — 2:14.39 (→ did not advance, 31st place)

Blanca Morales
 Heat — 2:14.79 (→ did not advance, 32nd place)

Women's 400m Freestyle
Karen Slowing
 Heat — 4:36.87 (→ did not advance, 23rd place)

Women's 800m Freestyle 
Karen Slowing
 Heat — 9:20.68 (→ did not advance, 19th place)

Women's 200m Butterfly
Blanca Morales
 Heat — 2:25.03 (→ did not advance, 28th place)

Women's 200m Individual Medley
Blanca Morales
 Heat — 2:38.16 (→ did not advance, 27th place)

Weightlifting

References

External links
Official Olympic Reports
Guatemala at the Olympic Games

Nations at the 1984 Summer Olympics
1984
Olympics